Vinai Kumar Saxena (born 23 March 1958) is the Lieutenant Governor of Delhi since 26 May 2022, appointed by BJP led Union Government. On 25 October 2015 he was appointed as the Chairman of Khadi and Village Industries Commission, an Organization under the Ministry of Medium, Small and Micro Enterprise. He remained chairman till 23 May 2022.

As Lieutenant Governor of Delhi
He was accused of Khadi Scam and money laundering of ₹1400 crore while he was the Chairman of Khadi and Village Industries Commission by the majority MLAs of the ruling party in the Legislative Assembly of Delhi. He sent legal notices against the AAP leaders refuting these claims.

Delhi High Court ordered Aam Aadmi Party to take down defematory posts from social media sites and said that the allegations were without merit. It also remarked that the sum of ₹17 lakhs was converted into 1400 crores in a fanciful way without proof or merit.

In November 2020, he was nominated as a member of Padma awards selection panel for 2021. In March 2021, he was appointed by the union government as a member of the national committee On the advice of BJP led Union Government of India, the President of India appointed him as the Lieutenant Governor of Delhi on 26 May 2022.

References

Lieutenant Governors of Delhi
Living people
1958 births